The RED A03 is a V12 four-stroke aircraft diesel engine designed and built by RED Aircraft GmbH of Adenau, Germany.

Development 

The engine received type approval from the European Aviation Safety Agency in December 2014 for use in any CS-23 aircraft in both normal and utility categories.
It powered the Yakovlev Yak-152 trainer on its 29 September 2016 first flight.
The RED A03 is presented by the ILA Berlin Air Show as an application in the Aerobatic sector and for Defence and Security.

The engine is proposed for the Hybrid Air Vehicles HAV 304/Airlander 10, a British hybrid airship design, powered by four engines and can be operated with two. In November 2021, an Air Tractor AT-301 made a first flight retrofitted with a RED A03 engine. The same month, a prototype Otto Celera 500L powered by a RED A03 engine was flown using Sustainable Aviation Fuel.

As of March 2023, there are reliable reports of flight testing on a DHC-2 Beaver.

Design 

It has twin double overhead camshafts.  A marine version was planned for 522 kW/700 hp at 3,900 rpm.
The cylinder banks' angle is 80 degrees.

Applications 
 Agricultural aircraft
 Air Tractor AT-301 (STC planned)
 Fletcher FU-24

 Airship
 Hybrid Air Vehicles HAV 304/Airlander 10 (proposed)

 Utility aircraft
 Ampaire Eco-Caravan (STC targeted for 2024).
 De Havilland Canada DHC-2 Beaver (STC planned)
 Junkers JU-52NG
 In-development twin-engine utility aircraft for 9-14 passengers or cargo from Russian Pro-Avia

 Business aircraft
 Otto Celera 500L (experimental)

 Trainer aircraft
 Yakovlev Yak-18
 Yakovlev Yak-52 and Yakovlev Yak-152 trainers

Specifications

RED A05 300hp V6 
The RED A05 is a 2017 preliminary design of a V6 engine with  displacement, outputting  at takeoff at 2127 propeller RPM and  continuously at 1995 propeller RPM, with a  best brake specific fuel consumption.

See also 

 Lycoming IO-580
 Lycoming IO-720
 Continental IO-550

References

External links

Aircraft diesel engines
2000s aircraft piston engines